Sunrise is a 1936 Chinese-language play by Cao Yu.
Cao Yu's daughter Wan Fang adapted the play into a libretto for the opera Sunrise by Jin Xiang in 2015.

References

1936 plays
Chinese-language plays
Chinese Republican era plays
Plays by Cao Yu
Chinese plays adapted into films
Plays adapted into operas